Pukhraj Bhalla is an Indian-Punjabi actor and singer. He is the son of comedian-actor Jaswinder Bhalla. He is best known for the web-series Yaar Jigree Kasooti Degree directed by Rabby Tiwana.

Career 
Pukhraj who made his debut in Pollywood with "Stupid 7″ in 2013 has been already seen unveiling his prowess in acting skills in supporting roles in movies Golak Bugni Bank Te Batua, Vaisakhi List, Harjeeta and Afsar. Now it is going to be really enthralling for his fans to see him performing as a lead actor. The popular Punjabi web-series "Yaar Jigree Kasooti Degree" did not only make its audience re-live their lively college days but it also helped Pukhraj. The webseries depicted real acting prowess of Pukhraj. He is the son of ace comedian of Punjabi industry Jaswinder Bhalla who has set a landmark of his acting. He made his debut in lead role with film Teriyan Meriyan Hera Pheriyan that was released in 2019. In an interview, Bhalla disclosed that, unlike his father, he likes grey shades.

Filmography

Singles

References

External links 
 

Living people
1994 births
Indian actors
21st-century Indian male singers
21st-century Indian singers